Denis Vincent Napthine  (born 6 March 1952) is a former Australian politician who was the 47th Premier of Victoria. Napthine was a Liberal Party member of the Victorian Legislative Assembly, representing the electoral district of Portland from 1988 to 2002 and South-West Coast from 2002 to 2015. He was elected leader of the Parliamentary Liberal Party on 6 March 2013 following the resignation of Ted Baillieu and was sworn in as premier on the same day. His party lost the Victorian state election on 29 November 2014 and he announced he would step down as leader of the Parliamentary Liberal Party, with Matthew Guy being elected his successor on 4 December.

Early life 
Napthine was born in 1952 to Len and Theresa Napthine in Geelong, Victoria, as the third child in a family of ten children.

Napthine spent his early school years at Winchelsea State School before attending Chanel College, a Catholic boys' school in Lovely Banks near Geelong. After graduating he attended the University of Melbourne, where he studied to be a veterinarian, undertaking a bachelor's and then a master's degree in veterinary science. He later completed a master's degree in business administration from Deakin University.

Political career 

Napthine was elected to the Victorian Legislative Assembly in 1988 as member for the country seat of Portland. He was re-elected in 1992, 1996 and 1999.

Napthine was appointed Parliamentary Secretary to the Minister for Health in 1992 and then promoted to Minister for Youth and Community Services in 1996 in Jeff Kennett's Liberal government, a position he held from 1996 to 1999.

Following the defeat of the Liberal Party at the 1999 election, Kennett resigned as Liberal leader and Napthine was elected to take his place. Napthine had briefly served as Deputy Liberal Leader, having been elected to the position just shortly before Kennett stood down as Liberal Leader. During his term as Opposition Leader the Liberal–National coalition split, fracturing the opposition parties.

Under Napthine's leadership, the Liberal Party did poorly in the polls and made no significant electoral inroads on the ruling Labor government. Shortly before the 2002 state election, Shadow Health Minister Robert Doyle challenged Napthine for the leadership of the Liberal Party. Doyle won the leadership by a narrow margin. At this election, Napthine ran in South-West Coast, essentially a reconfigured version of Portland. Although it was ancestrally Liberal territory, Napthine only managed to hold onto the seat with a significantly reduced margin which fell from 4.9 to only 0.7 points.  He was re-elected in November 2006 with an increased margin.

After the Liberals won the 2010 Victorian election, Napthine was made a member of the Baillieu cabinet. He served as the Minister for Ports, Racing, Regional Cities and Major Projects.

Premier of Victoria

On 6 March 2013, Baillieu resigned as state leader of the Liberal Party and hence as Premier of Victoria. At an emergency meeting of the Liberal partyroom, Napthine—who had turned 61 that day—was elected his successor. After the resignation of Geoff Shaw from the parliamentary Liberal Party earlier in the day, Napthine began leadership of a minority government, holding 43 seats (44 seats including that of the Speaker) to Labor's 43 seats, with Shaw sitting as an independent politician on the crossbench.

On 28 November 2013 Australian media reported that Napthine had 'secretly assisted' Shaw to draft a Private Member's Bill to change state abortion legislation which Napthine voted against in 2008. Napthine refuted the allegations and stated his Government had no plans to change abortion laws, nor would he support any such change. In June 2014 Napthine stated:"...that while I am Premier of this state, I will not allow Mr Shaw to introduce any legislation seeking to change the abortion laws in Victoria."

During September 2014 Napthine and Daniel Andrews told the Australian Christian Lobby that they would allow a conscience vote should a private members bill to repeal section eight of the Victorian abortion laws be introduced.  Section eight if removed would mean doctors are not required by law to refer a woman who wants an abortion to an abortion doctor or perform the abortion even if they have a conscientious objection.

In May 2014 a parliamentary privileges committee found that Shaw was not diligent in the use of his parliamentary car and fuel card. On 3 June 2014 Shaw told radio station 774 ABC Melbourne that he would support a no confidence motion in the Napthine government. On 11 June 2014, following a Labor move to expel Shaw from Parliament that was defeated on party lines with the support of the speaker, Napthine's government successfully moved a motion that resulted in the Members of the Legislative Assembly suspending Shaw for a period of eleven days, fined  and ordered  to apologise to the Parliament upon his return. Shaw's suspension followed a period of political instability under Napthine's leadership.

On 29 September 2014, Napthine along with former Minister for Public Transport and Roads Terry Mulder signed what was reported to be a $5.3 billion contract with the now defunct East West Connect consortium to build the controversial East West Link toll road. He has since received a lot of criticism for this, not only for his decision to sign on the eve of the month-long caretaker period before the upcoming November 2014 state election and before two legal cases into the planning approval for the project were resolved, but also for his decision, at the insistence of the East West Connect consortium, to direct the then state treasurer Michael O'Brien to sign a "side letter" guaranteeing the consortium compensation of more than $1 billion in the event that the court cases were successful or if for some other reason the contracts were cancelled (which Labor promised to do if it won the election), which was thought to be a contributing factor in the state having to pay what is thought to amount to $1.1 billion to EWC upon the declaration by the then new Andrews government to suspend work in December 2014, and the contracts eventually being terminated in June 2015. It was also revealed upon the contracts termination and release that the real cost of the Eastern section of East West Link amounted to $10.7 billion, $3.9 billion more than the $6.8 billion estimated cost by the Napthine government. In December 2015, the Victorian Auditor General revealed the cost of both sections of the East West Link would have been close to $22.8 billion in nominal terms.

In opposition
On 29 November 2014, after the Victorian state election, Napthine conceded defeat to Labor led by Daniel Andrews.

Napthine stated that he intended to serve a full parliamentary term despite losing the Premiership, however on 31 August 2015 he announced his resignation from the Victorian Parliament, which triggered a by-election in his electorate of South-West Coast.

Personal life 
Napthine and his wife Peggy have three children. His younger brother, Simon, was the unsuccessful ALP candidate for the federal seat of Flinders at the 2004 election.

One of Napthine's ancestors was convict Joseph Potaski.

See also

2014 Victorian state election

References

External links 
 

|-

|-

1952 births
Living people
Premiers of Victoria
Members of the Victorian Legislative Assembly
Liberal Party of Australia members of the Parliament of Victoria
Officers of the Order of Australia
Deakin University alumni
University of Melbourne alumni
Treasurers of Victoria
Leaders of the Opposition in Victoria (Australia)
Australian veterinarians
Male veterinarians
Politicians from Geelong
Australian people of Polish descent
21st-century Australian politicians